is the sixth single by Japanese band Antic Cafe. The title track is featured on the album Shikisai Moment.  The song peaked at No. 75 on the Japanese singles chart.

Track listing
 "Escapism" (エスカピズム) - 4:43

References

An Cafe songs
2005 singles
2005 songs
Loop Ash Records singles
Songs written by Kanon (bassist)